.22 Eargesplitten Loudenboomer is a wildcat rifle cartridge.

This humorously named cartridge was developed in the 1960s by P.O. Ackley for Bob Hutton of Guns & Ammo magazine, and was intended solely to exceed  muzzle velocity.  Ackley's loads only managed (Mach 4.2), firing a  bullet. Based on a .378 Weatherby Magnum case, the case is impractically over-capacity for the bore diameter, and so the cartridge remains a curiosity. The advent of new slower-burning smokeless powders may have changed the equation.

See also 
 List of rifle cartridges

References

Pistol and rifle cartridges
Wildcat cartridges